Leofric is an Old English name meaning "Friendly Kingdom", composed of "Leof" meaning friendly or desirable, and "ric" meaning kingdom or governmental state. The name may refer to

 Leofric (bishop)  (1016–1072), English religious leader
 Leofric (fl. 1070) (fl. 1070), English writer
 Leofric, Earl of Mercia (968–1057), English noble and benefactor of churches